Duncan G. Steel (born 1951) is an American experimental physicist, researcher and professor in quantum optics in condensed matter physics. He is the Robert J. Hiller Professor of Electrical Engineering, Professor of Physics, Professor of Biophysics, and Research Professor in the Institute of Gerontology at the University of Michigan. Steel is also a Guggenheim Scholar and a Fellow of American Physical Society, the Optical Society of America, and the Institute of Electrical and Electronics Engineers. He coedited the five-volume series on the Encyclopedia of Modern Optics.

Education
Steel graduated from the University of North Carolina, Chapel Hill with an A.B. in 1972. Graduated from the University of Michigan with a Ph.D. in 1976.
Prior to joining the faculty at Michigan, he was a Member of the Technical Staff and Senior Staff Physicist for the Hughes Aircraft Company at the Hughes Research Labs (HRL) in Malibu.  There he worked on optical phase conjugation and real time holography.  Working with Richard Lind, they demonstrated the first laser with a phase conjugate mirror using degenerate four-wave mixing.

Research
Steel works on nonlinear optical spectroscopy and coherent control of semiconductor heterostructures, for which he received 2010 Frank Isakson Prize for Optical Effects in Solids from the American Physical Society. His research focus is on using ultrafast optical techniques to manipulate electron spins embedded in semiconductor quantum dots to create quantum coherence as a new degree of freedom. Some of his publications describe the first demonstration of an optically driven CNOT gate in a solid state device and demonstration of entanglement in semiconductor system. In addition to semiconductor physics, he is also involved in the development and application of advanced laser spectroscopy methodology and other biophysical techniques for the study of protein folding and dynamics.

References

External links 
 "Optical Studies of Single Quantum Dots", Physics Today, October 2002 
 "Quantum logic gate lights up", Physics World, August 8, 2003
 "Quantum Information Processing Based on Optically Driven Semiconductor Quantum Dots", September 2004, Optics & Photonics News
  Michigan scientists working on super-fast, secure computing, Phys Org, September 9, 2009
  Lasers Lengthen Quantum Bit Memory, July 2009
  Entangling spin and light, Editors' Choice, Science, May 3, 2013

1951 births
Living people
Experimental physicists
American physicists
University of Michigan alumni
University of Michigan faculty